Inquisitor is a Cocoa plug-in for Mac OS X developed by David Watanabe.

Overview
Inquisitor replaces the Google search bar in Safari or Camino with a predictive-typing feature that can be used for the Google search engine, as well as other sites like a9.com, IMDb.com or Wikipedia. It is also available as an Ajax-powered web application, for use on browsers other than Safari, including Windows and Linux machines.

Camino
Inquisitor is only available for Safari as of the release of Inquisitor 3.0 beta 1, due to the small percentage of Camino users using it. The last supported version of Inquisitor for Camino was 2.6.

Mac OS X Leopard
Some of the developer builds of Mac OS X Leopard removed support for Input Managers, leading to concerns that Inquisitor may not function in Leopard.  However, the shipping build of Leopard supports Input Managers when installed with Administrator credentials.  On October 28, 2007, Inquisitor 3.0 (v49) was released, with a Leopard compliant installer.  Inquisitor now currently supports Safari 3.x and 4.x.

On May 9, 2009, Yahoo! acquired inquisitor.

iPhone
There is also an iPhone app of Inquisitor. It is available at the App Store for free. It was released on February 9, 2009, for iTunes USA users. The latest version is 1.0, and has not been updated before.

References

Further reading
 Yahoo plug-in gives brains to browser search
 Inquisitor for iPhone

MacOS-only software
Yahoo! Search
Yahoo! acquisitions